The Chinese Physical Society (CPS) a professional society of physicists established in 1932. It is part of the China Association for Science and Technology. Current membership is at around 40,000. CPS has been a member of the International Union of Pure and Applied Physics (IUPAP) since 1984 and of the Association of Asia Pacific Physical Societies (AAPPS) since 1990.

Journals

See also
:Category:Chinese Physical Society academic journals

External links
Chinese Physical Society website

Physics societies
Science and technology in China
Scientific societies based in China
1932 establishments in China